The 1998 SANFL Grand Final was an Australian rules football competition. Port Adelaide beat Sturt by 75 to 66.

References 

SANFL Grand Finals
SANFL Grand Final, 1998